Indian hemp may refer to any of various fiber bearing plants:

 Apocynum cannabinum
 Cannabis indica
 Crotalaria juncea, native to India
 Sida rhombifolia
 Asclepias incarnata, native to North America
 Hibiscus cannabinus